Dave Simmons (born 24 July 1959) is the former head men's basketball coach at McNeese State University.

Div I Head Coaching Record

References

1959 births
Living people
American men's basketball coaches
American men's basketball players
Basketball coaches from Louisiana
Basketball players from Louisiana
College men's basketball head coaches in the United States
Louisiana Tech Bulldogs basketball coaches
Louisiana Tech Bulldogs basketball players
McNeese Cowboys basketball coaches
Northwestern State Demons basketball coaches
People from DeRidder, Louisiana